Ante Aikio (Sámi: Luobbal Sámmol Sámmol Ánte; born 1977) is a Finnish linguist of Sámi origin who has been a professor of Sámi languages at the Sámi University of Applied Sciences in Kautokeino, Norway since 2015. Prior to this he has been a professor of Sámi language at the Giellagas Institute at the University of Oulu in Finland.

In 2009, Aikio published his dissertation on Sámi loanwords in Finnish. In addition, Aikio has widely studied the history and etymology of the Uralic languages and the Sámi ethnolinguistic past.

Important publications
Ante Aikio. An essay on substrate studies and the origin of Saami, in Etymologie, Entlehnungen und Entwicklungen: Festschrift für Jorma Koivulehto zum 70. Geburtstag, Société Néophilologique de Helsinki, Helsinki, 2004.
Jussi Ylikoski & Ante Aikio (ed.) Sámit, sánit, sátnehámit – riepmoc̆ála Pekka Sammallahtii miessemánu 21. beaivve 2007, Suomalais-Ugrilainen Seura, Helsinki, 2007.
Ante Aikio. The Saami loanwords in Finnish and Karelian, Oulun yliopisto, Oulu, 2009. Academia.edu
Ante Aikio. "An essay on Saami ethnolinguistic prehistory", in Mémoires de la Société Finno-Ougrienne 266, 2012. PDF
Ante Aikio. "Proto-Uralic", in Bakró-Nagy, Marianne; Laakso, Johanna; Skribnik, Elena (eds.). Oxford Guide to the Uralic Languages. Oxford, UK: Oxford University Press. pp. 46, 50–52, 2019. Academia.edu

References

21st-century linguists
Living people
1977 births
Academic staff of the Sámi University of Applied Sciences
Finnish emigrants to Norway
Finnish Sámi people
Linguists of Sámi
Finnish Sámi academics